Senegal national under-23 football team (also known as Senegal Olympic, Senegal U-23) represents Senegal in international football competitions in the Olympic Games and the CAF U-23 Championship. The selection is limited to players under the age of 23 but the Olympics allows for the addition of up to three overage players. The team is controlled by the Senegalese Football Federation. Senegal made its first appearance in football at the 2012 Olympics in London.

Competitive Record

CAF U-23 Championship

Olympic Games

*Denotes draws including knockout matches decided on penalty kicks.

Recent results

Forthcoming fixtures

Squad

Current squad
The following 21 players were called up for the 2015 U-23 Africa Cup of Nations in Senegal.

|-----
! colspan="9" bgcolor="#B0D3FB" align="left" |
|----- bgcolor="#DFEDFD"

|-----
! colspan="9" bgcolor="#B0D3FB" align="left" |
|----- bgcolor="#DFEDFD"

|-----
! colspan="9" bgcolor="#B0D3FB" align="left" |
|----- bgcolor="#DFEDFD"

Recent callups
The following players took part in either the 2011 CAF U-23 Championship that was held in Morocco and, or the 2012 Olympic play-off that was played against Oman on 23 April 2012 but were not named in the final squad for the 2012 Summer Olympics.

|-----
! colspan="9" bgcolor="#B0D3FB" align="left" |
|----- bgcolor="#DFEDFD"

|-----
! colspan="9" bgcolor="#B0D3FB" align="left" |
|----- bgcolor="#DFEDFD"

See also
 Senegal national football team
 Senegal national under-20 football team

External links
 Official website

References

under-23
African national under-23 association football teams